Hobart City Beachside Football Club is an Australian semi-professional soccer club based in the suburb of Sandy Bay in Hobart, Tasmania. The club's colours are green and black. The club plays its home games at Sandown Park, known to fans as the Tropicana Cauldron or simply The Tropicana. In 2021, Beachside FC and Hobart City merged to form a club under the current name.

History

Beachside FC

Beachside FC was founded in 1975 under the name Howrah Soccer Club because it played in the Hobart suburb of Howrah. The club then adopted the name Beachside HSC when it moved to its current home near Long Beach, in Sandy Bay keeping the HSC from Howrah Soccer Club despite no longer playing in that suburb.  In 2011, the name was changed subtly to Beachside FC.

Hobart City
In 1977, Hobart City Azzurri was founded to provide a youth soccer club for the Italian community. In 1981, the Club changed its name to Hobart City FC, as a result of a mandate from Soccer Australia to remove all ethnic based names club titles. In 1986, the club become the Southern Tasmanian Seniors Division 1 Premiers and Knock Out Cup Winners. The club ceased to exist in late 1991, with its members joining other clubs or retiring. In 2021, family members of the original founders, began a re-creation of the Hobart City Azzurri.

Merger
In 2021, Beachside FC and Hobart City FC merged to form a new club under the name Hobart City Beachside FC.

Team Honours
Southern Championship 1 Champions (2014, 2015, 2016, 2017, 2018, 2019)
2013 Southern Premier League Champions
2010 Southern Tasmanian Division One Champions (Promoted to Southern Championship)
2007 Southern Tasmanian Division One Champions

Individual honours
The club's best and fairest medal is named after Alistair Hales while a yearly award is presented for the best contributor to the club's off-field success. This is named after James Dunsby, a club life member who died in an SAS selection test in Wales.

Seasons
A summary of the seasons of the Beachside Senior Men's Team:

Teams
In 2014 the club has male teams playing in the Tasmanian Southern Premier League, Premier League Reserves, Under 20s & Social Division Three. The club also has a female teams playing in Division One and youth teams. All Beachside teams play in competitions run by Football Federation Tasmania.

Current competitions
Beachside has teams involved in the following senior competitions:
Southern Championship
Southern Championship 1
Southern Women's Championship
Southern Women's Championship 1
Southern Championship 3
Southern Championship 6
Southern Womens Championship 1 Tier 1

See also
Association football in Tasmania

References

External links
Beachside's Official Website
Beachside's Facebook Page
Beachside's Twitter Feed

Soccer clubs in Tasmania
1973 establishments in Australia
Sport in Hobart